Bailly-le-Franc is a commune in the Aube department in the Grand Est region of north-central France.

Geography
Bailly-le-Franc is located some 20 km south-west of Saint-Dizier and 15 km north-east of Brienne-le-Château. The northern border of the commune is the departmental border between Aube and Marne while the eastern border is the departmental border between Aube and Haute-Marne. Access to the commune is by the D127 road from Margerie-Hancourt in the west which passes through the centre of the commune and continues south-east, changing to the D13 at the commune border, to Droyes. The D655 comes from Outines in the north, changing to the D56 at the communal border and passing through the commune then continuing south-west to Chavanges. The south of the commune is forested with the rest farmland.

The Ruisseau de Chevry flows out of the Étang de Bailly in the west of the commune and passes through the commune towards the east before turning south to form the eastern border of the commune and the department and continuing through the Étang de la Horre to join the Voire. The Ruisseau du Pré Darras forms the northern border of the commune and the department as it flows east to join the Droye.

Neighbouring communes and villages

Administration

List of Successive Mayors

Demography
In 2017 the commune had 37 inhabitants.

Sites and monuments

The Church of the Exaltation of Saint Croix (16th century) is registered as an historical monument. The church contains many items that are registered as historical objects:

A Chair (18th century)
A Statue: Saint Helen (16th century)
A Stained glass window: Virgin of Pity (16th century)
The Retable in the main altar (18th century)
A Ciborium (18th century)
A Paten (19th century)
A Chalice (18th century)
An Altar Painting: Saint Helen digging up the Cross on Golgotha (19th century)
A Processional Staff: The Virgin (19th century)
A Processional Staff: Sacred Heart (19th century)
An Altar Painting: The Virgin trampling original sin underfoot (19th century)
A Statue: Christ on the Cross (18th century)
2 Tapestry Medallions: Angels and Saint Paul adoring the Blessed Sacrament (18th century)
A Baptismal font (12th century)
The Furniture in the Church
An Altar Painting: Constantine prostrates himself before the Cross (18th century)

See also
Communes of the Aube department

References

External links
Bailly-le-Franc on Géoportail, National Geographic Institute (IGN) website 
Bailly-le-Franc on the 1750 Cassini Map

Communes of Aube